The Bodhisattva vow is a vow (Sanskrit: praṇidhāna, lit. aspiration or resolution) taken by some Mahāyāna Buddhists to achieve full buddhahood for the sake of all sentient beings. One who has taken the vow is nominally known as a bodhisattva (a being working towards buddhahood). This can be done by venerating all Buddhas and by cultivating supreme moral and spiritual perfection, to be placed in the service of others. In particular, bodhisattvas promise to practice the six perfections of giving, moral discipline, patience, effort, concentration and wisdom in order to fulfill their bodhicitta aim of attaining buddhahood for the sake of all beings. 

The vow is commonly taken in a ritual setting, overseen by a senior monastic, teacher or guru. 

Whereas the prātimokṣa vows cease at death, the bodhisattva vow extends into future lives. The bodhisattva vows should not be confused with the Bodhisattva Precepts (Skt. bodhisattva-śīla), which are specific ethical guidelines for bodhisattvas.

Background 

Buddhist sources like the Buddhavaṃsa and the Mahāvastu, contain stories of how in a previous life, Sakyamuni (then known as Sumedha) encountered the previous Buddha, Dīpankara, and made the vow to one day become a Buddha. Dīpankara confirmed that he would become a Buddha in the future. All early Buddhist schools held that making a vow in front of a living Buddha (and receiving a prediction), just like Sakyamuni had done, was the only way to become a bodhisattva. This view remains the orthodox understanding of bodhisattva vows in the Theravada tradition.

In the Mahayana Lalitavistarasutra, the bodhisattva Siddhartha (before becoming Sakyamuni Buddha) is said to have taken the following vow:I will attain the immortal, undecaying, pain-free Bodhi, and free the world from all pain.The Sanskrit Aṣṭasāhasrikā Prajñāpāramitā sutra states that a bodhisattva should train themselves with the following thought:ātmānaṃ ca tathatāyāṃ sthāpayiṣyāmi sarvalokānugrahāya, sarvasattvān api tathatāyāṃ sthāpayiṣyāmi, aprameyaṃ sattvadhātuṃ parinirvāpayiṣyāmīti

My own self I will place in Suchness, and, so that all the world might be helped, I will place all beings into Suchness, and I will lead to Nirvana the whole immeasurable world of beings.

The sutra further states that "with that intention should a Bodhisattva undertake all the exercises which bring about all the wholesome roots. But he should not boast about them."

In later Indian Mahāyāna Buddhism (and in modern Mahayana as well), one can become a bodhisattva by taking the vow and giving rise to bodhicitta in a ceremonial setting. Indian Mahāyāna Buddhists often accomplished this through a ritual called the "seven part worship" (saptāṇgapūjā or saptavidhā anuttarapūjā), which consists of: vandana (obeisance), worship, refuge, confession, rejoicing, prayers and requesting the buddhas to remain in the world.

Fourfold vows

In Mahāyāna sutras 
Fourfold bodhisattva vows (that is, a set of vows with four main components), are found in numerous Mahāyāna sutras. According to Jan Nattier, there is a set of four bodhisattva vows that appears in various sutras including the Ugraparipṛcchā Sūtra, the Lotus Sūtra (in the Dharmaraksa and Kumarajiva translations), the Aṣṭasāhasrikā Prajñāpāramitā (in the Chinese translation by Lokaksema and Chih Ch'ien), the Avadānaśataka and the Compassionate Lotus sutra. Nattier translates this fourfold vow as follows:
The unrescued I will rescue

The unliberated I will liberate

The uncomforted I will comfort

Those who have not yet reached paranirvana, I will cause to attain paranirvanaNattier also notes that a similar set of four vows (with small differences in wording) appears in the Dipankara Jataka, the Mahavastu, the Aṣṭasāhasrikā Prajñāpāramitā (in the Chinese translation by Kumarajiva), the Pañcaviṃśatisāhasrikā Prajñāpāramitā and in some Lotus Sutra translations. Nattier translates this other fourfold vow as follows:
Having crossed over [myself], I will rescue [others].

Liberated, I will liberate [others].

Comforted, I will comfort [others].

Having attained paranirvana, I will cause [others] to attain paranirvana.Nattier further notes that "it is quite possible to identify clear antecedents of these vows in pre-Mahayana literature" and thus it is likely that these fourfold vows evolved from earlier passages (found in the Digha Nikaya and the Majjhima Nikaya as well as the Chinese Agamas) that describe the activity of the Buddha. One such passage states: Awakened, the Blessed One teaches the Dhamma for the sake of awakening.

Disciplined, the Blessed One teaches the Dhamma for the sake of disciplining.

Calmed, the Blessed One teaches the Dhamma for the sake of calming.

Having crossed over, the Blessed One teaches the Dhamma for the sake of crossing over.

In East Asian Buddhism 
In East Asian Buddhism, the most common bodhisattva vows are a series of "four extensive vows" outlined by the Tiantai Patriarch Zhiyi. According to Robert F. Rhodes, Zhiyi presents two versions of the four vows. The first one is taken from the Chinese version of the Lotus Sūtra and states:
 Those who have not yet been ferried over, I will ferry over.
 Those who have not yet understood, I will cause them to understand.
 Those who have not settled themselves, I will cause them to be settled.
 Those who have not attained nirvana, I will cause them to attain nirvana.

The second set of vows is original to Zhiyi's corpus and states:

 Sentient beings, limitless in number, I vow to ferry over.
 Passions (klesa) which are numberless, I vow to extinguish.
 The Dharma-gates without end (in number), I vow to know.
 The supreme Buddha Way, I vow to actualize.

Zhiyi explains that these vows correspond to the Four Noble Truths and that these vows arise with the four truths as their basis.

The following table presents the fourfold bodhisattva vow in various languages:

Vows from the Avataṃsaka Sūtra

The Avataṃsaka Sūtra, a large composite text, contains various passages discussing the practices and vows that bodhisattvas undertake. One example can be found in book 18 of the text, which contains the following ten vows:Enlightening beings have ten pure vows: (1) they vow to develop living beings to maturity, without wearying; (2) they vow to fully practice all virtues and purify all worlds; (3) they vow to serve the Enlightened, always engendering honor and respect; (4) they vow to keep and protect the true teaching, not begrudging their lives; (5) they vow to observe with wisdom and enter the lands of the Buddhas; (6) they vow to be of the same essence as all enlightening beings; (7) they vow to enter the door of realization of thusness and comprehend all things; (8) they vow that those who see them will develop faith and all be benefited; (9) they vow to stay in the world forever by spiritual power; (10) they vow to fulfill the practice of Universal Good, and master the knowledge of all particulars and all ways of liberation. These are the ten pure vows of enlightening beings.

Ten vows of Samantabhadra 

In the Avataṃsaka Sūtra, Samantabhadra makes ten vows which are an important source for East Asian Buddhism. Samantabhadra's vows also appear in the Samantabhadra-caryā-praṇidhānam, which is often appended to the end of the Avataṃsaka but originally circulated as an independent text. 

Reciting these ten vows is also promoted by Shantideva in his Śikṣāsamuccaya.

The ten vows of Samantabhadra are:

 The vow to pay homage to all the buddhas
 To praise the virtues of the buddhas
 To serve and make offerings to the buddhas
 To confess past misdeeds and uphold the precepts
 To rejoice in the merit and virtues of buddhas, bodhisattvas and all sentient beings
 To ask the buddhas to preach the Dharma
 To ask the buddhas to refrain from entering nirvana
 To always follow the buddhas' teachings
 To serve/benefit all sentient beings
 To transfer the merit from all practices to the liberation of all beings

Vows from Mahayana treatises

Shantideva's vow 
The Tibetan Buddhist Tradition widely makes use of verses from chapter three of Shantideva's Bodhisattvacaryāvatāra, which is entitled Embracing Bodhicitta. Various forms of these verses are used to generate bodhicitta and take the bodhisattva vow. The set of verses which are considered to be the actual taking of the bodhisattva vow are verses 23 and 24 of the third chapter. These verses state:

In the Bodhisattvacaryāvatāra, the actual taking of the vow is preceded by various other preparatory practices and prayers, particularly what is called the Seven Branch Practice (Tib. yan lag bdun pa), often done through the recitation of a prayer. The seven branches are:

 Prostration to the three jewels, supplicating Buddhas and bodhisattvas
 Making physical, verbal and mental offerings to the Buddhas
 Confessing one's negative deeds, "one admits to doing the negative deed, one feels true remorse and then one resolves not to do it again."
 Rejoicing in the goodness and virtues of others
 Requesting the Buddhas to turn the wheel of Dharma (to teach the way)
 Requesting the Buddhas not to pass away into final extinction, but to keep coming back to teach and help others
 Dedicating the merit of all good deeds for the benefit of all beings

The 14th Dalai Lama teaches the following way of taking the vow, which begins by reading "through the second and third chapters of the Bodhisattvacaryāvatāra up until the second line of verse 23." The Dalai Lama then writes:

In order to take this vow, we should imagine that in front of us are the Buddha and his eight close disciples; the six ornaments, and the two supreme teachers, including Shantideva; and all the realized masters of the Buddhist tradition, in particular the holders of the Sakya, Gelug, Kagyu, and Nyingma schools of Tibet—in fact, all the Buddhas and Bodhisattvas. Consider also that we are surrounded by all the beings in the universe. With this visualization, we shall now read the Seven Branch Prayer ...

Consider that we are surrounded by all the beings in the universe and generate compassion for them. Think of the Buddha and feel great devotion to him. Now, with compassion and devotion, pray, "May I attain Buddhahood!" and recite:

"Teachers, Buddhas, Bodhisattvas, listen! Just as you, who in the past have gone to bliss, Conceived the awakened attitude of mind, Likewise, for the benefit of beings, I will generate this self-same attitude."

When we recite these lines for the third time, at the words, "I will generate this self-same attitude," think that you have generated this bodhichitta in the depth of your hearts, in the very marrow of your bones, and that you will never go back on this promise. Traditionally we now recite the last nine verses of the chapter as a conclusion to taking the vow.In Tibetan Buddhism there are two lineages of the bodhisattva vow, which are linked to two sets of Bodhisattva precepts or moral rules. The first is associated with the Cittamatra movement of Indian Buddhism, and is said to have originated with the bodhisattva Maitreya, and to have been propagated by the Indian master Asanga. The second is associated with the Madhyamaka tradition, is said to have originated with the bodhisattva Manjusri and to have been propagated by Nagarjuna, and later by Shantideva. The main difference between these two lineages of the bodhisattva vow is that in the Cittamatra lineage the vow cannot be received by one who has not previously received the pratimokṣa vows. Both traditions share a set of 18 major precepts (or "downfalls"). There are also sets of minor precepts.

Bodhicittotpadaviddhi 
A ritual text on the bodhisattva vow attributed to Nāgārjuna called Bodhicittotpadaviddhi (Ritual for giving rise to bodhicitta, Tib. Byang chub mchog tu sems bskyed pa'i cho ga) has the following bodhisattva vow:Just as the past tathāgata arhat samyaksambuddhas, when engaging in the behavior of a bodhisattva, generated the aspiration to unsurpassed complete enlightenment so that all beings be liberated, all beings be freed, all beings be relieved, all beings attain complete nirvana, all beings be placed in omniscient wisdom, in the same way, I whose name is so-and-so, from this time forward, generate the aspiration to unsurpassed complete enlightenment so that all beings be liberated, all beings be freed, all beings be relieved, all beings attain complete nirvana, all beings be placed in omniscient wisdom.

See also 
 Parinamana

References

Further reading

External links
 Brahma Net Sutra
 Twenty Verses on the Bodhisattva Vow by Chandragomin
 The Actions for Training from Pledged Bodhichitta, Root Bodhisattva Vows and the Secondary Bodhisattva Vows by Dr. Alexander Berzin (including commentary according to Tibetan Gelug Tradition)
 The Ethical Discipline of Bodhisattvas, by Geshe Sonam Rinchen (Tibetan Gelug Tradition)
 Nine Considerations and Criteria for Benefiting Beings

Mahayana
Buddhist oaths
Bodhisattvas